Thiidae is a family of crabs in the crustacean order Decapoda.

Genera

The family contains two genera in two subfamilies:

 Subfamily Nautilocorystinae Ortmann, 1893
 Nautilocorystes Milne Edwards, 1837
 Subfamily Thiinae Dana, 1852
 Thia Leach, 1815

References

Decapod families
Decapods